Thou Fool is a 1928 British silent drama film directed by Fred Paul and starring Stewart Rome, Marjorie Hume and Mary Rorke. Anthony Asquith worked on the film as an assistant director.

Cast
 Stewart Rome as Robert Barker 
 Marjorie Hume as Elsie Glen 
 Mary Rorke as Ldy MacDonald 
 J. Fisher White as James Scobie 
 Wyndham Guise as Duncan Glen 
 Mickey Brantford as Robert as a Child 
 Darby Foster as Harry Clement 
 Patrick Aherne as Undetermined Role

References

External links

1928 films
British silent feature films
1928 drama films
Films directed by Fred Paul
British drama films
British black-and-white films
1920s English-language films
1920s British films
Silent drama films